The Kyrganay Range ( or хребет Кыргонай) is a range of mountains in Chukotka Autonomous Okrug, Russian Far East. Administratively the range is part of Bilibino District.

The village of Keperveyem is located at the feet of the range in its western end. Bilibino is located about  further to the north.

Geography
The Kyrganay Range rises above the northern bank of the Maly Anyuy River. To the east the mountain range is limited by the Egilknyveyem River and to the west by the valley of the Maly Keperveyem River, both right hand tributaries of the Maly Anyuy River. To the south, on the other side of the Maly Anyuy, rises the Chuvanay Range. The ghost town of Aliskerovo, beyond which rises the Ilirney Range, lies at the eastern end of the Kyrganay Mountains.

The Kyrganay Range is part of the East Siberian System of mountains and is one of the subranges of the Anadyr Highlands. The mountains are characterized by a smooth relief, like most of the neighboring mountain ranges of Bilibino District, such as the Rauchuan Range further to the north. The southern sides of the slopes of the range are covered with sparse taiga.

See also
List of mountains and hills of Russia
List of inhabited localities in Bilibinsky District

References

External links
Chukotka Tourism
Горы, ущелья и пещеры мира - Ilirney Range
 Water of Russia - Small Anyui
ГОРЫ СЕВЕРО-ВОСТОКА РОССИИ
O.Yu.Glushkova, Late Pleistocene Glaciations in North-East Asia

Mountain ranges of Russia
Mountain ranges of Chukotka Autonomous Okrug
Landforms of Siberia